Berenjabad (also Romanized as Berenjābād; also known as Birinjābād) is a village in Sharabian Rural District, Mehraban District, Sarab County, East Azerbaijan Province, Iran. At the 2006 census, its population was 354, in 69 families.

References 

Populated places in Sarab County